Events from the year 1817 in Sweden

Incumbents
 Monarch – Charles XIII

Events
 16 February – Förlofningen by Dorothea Dunckel has its premier at the Aurora ordens teater.
 - The first suggestion to abolish the legal minority of adult unmarried women is discussed in the Riksdag. 
 - Samuel Owen constructs the first Paddle steamer in Sweden. 
 - Gustaf Fredrik Wirsén inducted full member, and Justina Casagli, Elisabet Frösslind, Anna Sofia Sevelin and Jeanette Wässelius made associée of the Royal Swedish Academy of Music.
 - Filippo Taglioni appointed ballet master at the Royal Swedish Ballet.

Births
 21 February – Fanny Westerdahl, stage actress (died 1873)
 24 March – Fritz von Dardel, artist (died 1901) 
 10 July – Wilhelmina Bonde, courtier  (died 1899) 
 6 September - Helga de la Brache, impostor  (died 1885) 
 2 October - Gunnar Wennerberg
 6 October – Gustaf Lagerbjelke, poet composer and politician  (died 1901) 
  – Sophia Wilkens, reform educator of the disabled   (died 1873)

Deaths
 8 March - Anna Maria Lenngren, poet (born 1754)

References

 
Years of the 19th century in Sweden